Le magique is a 1996 Tunisian drama film directed by Azdine Melliti. The film was selected as the Tunisian entry for the Best Foreign Language Film at the 68th Academy Awards, but was not accepted as a nominee.

Cast
 Ahmed Chebil as Deanie
 Azdine Melliti as Caesar's Father
 Mehdi Saffar as Caesar
 Kamel Touati as Deanie's Father

See also
 List of submissions to the 68th Academy Awards for Best Foreign Language Film
 List of Tunisian submissions for the Academy Award for Best Foreign Language Film

References

External links
 

1996 films
1996 drama films
1990s Arabic-language films
1990s French-language films
Tunisian drama films
1996 multilingual films
Tunisian multilingual films